The 2022–23 UEFA Women's Champions League group stage began on 19 October and ended on 22 December 2022. A total of 16 teams compete in the group stage to decide the eight places in the knockout phase of the 2022–23 UEFA Women's Champions League.

Draw
The draw was held on 3 October and saw the 16 teams split into four pools of four teams.
Pot 1 contained the four direct entrants, i.e., the Champions League holders and the champions of the top three associations based on their 2021 UEFA women's country coefficients.
Pot 2, 3 and 4 contained the remaining teams, seeded based on their 2022 UEFA women's club coefficients.
Teams from the same association could not be drawn into the same group. Prior to the draw, UEFA formed one pairing of teams for associations with two or three teams based on television audiences, where one team was drawn into Groups A–B and another team into Groups C–D, so that the two teams played on different days. Clubs from countries with severe winter conditions (Sweden) were assigned a position in their group which allowed them to play away on matchday 6.

  Barcelona and  Real Madrid
  Paris Saint-Germain and Lyon
  Bayern Munich and VfL Wolfsburg
  Chelsea and Arsenal
  Juventus and Roma

Teams
Below are the participating teams (with their 2022 UEFA club coefficients), grouped by their seeding pot. They include:
4 teams which entered in this stage
12 winners of the Round 2 (7 from Champions Path, 5 from League Path)

Notes

Format
In each group, teams played against each other home-and-away in a round-robin format. The top two teams of each group advanced to the quarter-finals.

Tiebreakers
Teams are ranked according to points (3 points for a win, 1 point for a draw, 0 points for a loss). If two or more teams are tied on points, the following tiebreaking criteria are applied, in the order given, to determine the rankings (see Article 18 Equality of points – group stage, Regulations of the UEFA Women's Champions League):
Points in head-to-head matches among the tied teams;
Goal difference in head-to-head matches among the tied teams;
Goals scored in head-to-head matches among the tied teams;
If more than two teams were tied, and after applying all head-to-head criteria above, a subset of teams are still tied, all head-to-head criteria above are reapplied exclusively to this subset of teams;
Goal difference in all group matches;
Goals scored in all group matches;
Away goals scored in all group matches;
Wins in all group matches;
Away wins in all group matches;
Disciplinary points (direct red card = 3 points; double yellow card = 3 points; single yellow card = 1 point);
UEFA club coefficient.

Groups
Times are CET/CEST, as listed by UEFA (local times, if different, are in parentheses).

Group A

Group B

Group C

Group D

Notes

References

External links

Fixtures and Results, 2022–23, UEFA.com

group stage
2022-23
October 2022 sports events in Europe
November 2022 sports events in Europe
December 2022 sports events in Europe